The Endothyracea is a superfamily in the foraminiferal order, Fusulinida (or as often, suborder Fusulinina) known from the upper Devonian to the Lower Permian. Probably ancestral to the Fusulinacea.

Diagnosis

Fusulinida with multichambered, septate tests, planispirally to streptospirally coiled at least in the early stage, may uncoil and become straight in the late growth stage.

Taxonomy

Taxonomic relationships

The Endothyracea as presented in the Treatise was one of only three superfamilies in the Fusulinina, the others being the Parathuramminacea and Fusulinacea.  With the discovery of more genera since publication of the Treatise in 1964 and concomitant development of new perspectives, the Endothyracea was split into a number of newly defined superfamilies, included in a revised and smaller Endothyracea  based on the family Endothyridae.

Taxonomy

The Endothyracea, as now defined, envelops the Endothyridae and contains the following subfamilies.
Endostaffellinae
Endothyrinae
Endothyranoposinae :Haplophragmellinae

References

Foraminifera superfamilies
Carboniferous life
Permian life
Late Devonian first appearances
Cisuralian extinctions